Brittany Elizabeth Curran (born June 2, 1990) is an American film and television actress. Beginning as a child actress, she is known for her roles on the television series Men of a Certain Age and The Magicians, and for the film Dear White People. She won a Peabody Award for her work on Men of a Certain Age.

Life and career
Curran was born in Weymouth, Massachusetts and also lived in other parts of the Massachusetts area including Avon, Marstons Mills, Cape Cod and Hingham. As a child, she took part in plays and also studied ballet, jazz and tap and the violin, as well as participating in summer theatre.

At eleven years old, Curran made her screen acting debut on an episode of the sketch comedy series MADtv in 2001. She went on to guest star in the television series Drake & Josh, The Suite Life of Zack & Cody, The Suite Life on Deck, Ghost Whisperer, Criminal Minds and The Young and the Restless.

In 2009, Curran was cast in her best-known role to date as Lucy Tranelli in the TNT comedy-drama series Men of a Certain Age, the daughter of Ray Romano's character. In 2011, she was nominated for a Young Artist Award for Best Performance in a TV Series (Comedy or Drama) – Supporting Young Actress, for her work in the series. The series was canceled in 2011, after two seasons.

Curran also had roles in the films 13 Going on 30, Akeelah and the Bee, The Haunting Hour: Don't Think About It, The Uninvited, Legally Blondes and Dear White People. In 2012, she was cast in the film Backmask (retitled Exeter before release), directed by Marcus Nispel. In 2013, she had a recurring role as Phoebe Daly on the ABC Family series Twisted.

She graduated from University of California, Los Angeles in June 2015 with a Bachelor of Arts in American Literature & Culture.

In 2017 Curran joined the cast of The Magicians on SyFy playing Fen, the Fillorian wife of Eliot. She was promoted to series regular for season 3 of the show.

In 2020 Curran co-hosted for the Travel Channel show, History of Trains.

Filmography

Film

Television

Awards and nominations

Personal life
Curran began dating James Ingram in 2013. They became engaged on January 12, 2020 after 7 years of dating.

References

External links
 

1990 births
Living people
21st-century American actresses
Actresses from Massachusetts
American child actresses
American television actresses
American video game actresses
American film actresses
American voice actresses
People from Weymouth, Massachusetts
University of California, Los Angeles alumni